Tracy L. Kerdyk (born March 5, 1966) is an American professional golfer who played on the LPGA Tour.

Kerdyk was born in Coral Gables, Florida. She had an impressive amateur career. In 1987, she won the U.S. Women's Amateur Public Links and was runner-up in the U.S. Women's Amateur. She played college golf at the University of Miami where she won a record 11 times in 1988. She was a two-time All-American and 1988 NCAA Collegiate Player of the Year. She also played on the 1988 U.S. Curtis Cup team.

Kerdyk played on the LPGA Tour from 1989 to 1999 and won once in 1995.

Kerdyk was Vice President of New Business Development for the Futures Tour from 1999 until 2012. She is currently a realtor registered with Kerdyk Real Estate.

Amateur wins
1982 American Junior Golf Classic
1983 PGA Junior Championship, Junior Orange Bowl, Doral Junior Championship
1987 Canadian Women's Amateur, U.S. Women's Amateur Public Links

Professional wins

LPGA Tour wins (1)

Team appearances
Amateur
Curtis Cup (representing the United States): 1988

References

External links
 

1966 births
Living people
American female golfers
Miami Hurricanes women's golfers
LPGA Tour golfers
Golf administrators
Golfers from Florida
Sportspeople from Coral Gables, Florida